Ganna Walska Lotusland, also known as Lotusland, is a non-profit botanical garden located in Montecito, near Santa Barbara, California, United States. The (15 ha / 37 acres) garden is the historic estate of Madame Ganna Walska. The County of Santa Barbara restricts visitation via a conditional use permit: Lotusland botanic garden is open to the public by advance reservation only, with walking tours 1½ to 2 hours long.

History
Ralph Kinton Stevens purchased the land in 1882; he and his wife, Caroline Lucy Tallant, named the property "Tanglewood". They established a lemon and palm nursery and eventually added other tropical plants to the collection and were among the early plantsmen of Santa Barbara. 

In 1916 the estate was sold to the Gavit family, from Albany, New York, who renamed it "Cuesta Linda". They added landscape elements, garden structures, and the main residence designed in 1919 by Reginald Johnson in the Mediterranean Revival style. In 1921–1927 they commissioned additional landscape buildings and alterations to the residence in the Spanish Colonial Revival style from George Washington Smith. His work includes the water garden pool house and the distinctive pink walls of the estate.

The gardens were created over four decades by opera singer Madame Ganna Walska, who owned the property as a private residence from 1941 until her death in 1984. She was assisted in landscape planning and garden design by Peter Riedel, Ralph Stevens, Lockwood DeForest, and Joseph Knowles. The garden was opened to the public in 1993.

Gardens

The Lotusland estate grounds contain several distinct gardens, including:

The Blue Garden
Featuring plants with silvery to blue-gray foliage, including Blue Atlas Cedar (Cedrus libani var. atlantica 'Glauca'), Chilean wine palms (Jubaea chilensis), blue fescue (Festuca ovina var. glauca), Senecio mandraliscae, Mexican blue palm (Brahea armata), Queensland kauri (Agathis robusta), bunya-bunya (Araucaria bidwillii), hoop pine (Araucaria cunninghamii) and two camphor trees (Cinnamomum camphora).

Bromeliads gardens
Here bromeliads cover the ground between large coast live oaks (Quercus agrifolia). Other notable plants include a branched pygmy date palm (Phoenix roebelinii), Trithrinax brasiliensis palms and giant ponytail palms (Beaucarnea recurvata).

Butterfly gardens
Featuring varieties of flowering plants that support butterflies and other insects.

The Cactus Garden

Cactus garden featuring a collection of columnar cacti begun in 1929 by Merritt Dunlap. Over 500 plants, representing about 300 different species of cacti in geographically organized groups. Notable specimens include species of Opuntia from the Galapagos Islands, Armatocereus from Peru and a complete collection of the genus Weberbauerocereus. Accent plants include Fouquieria columnaris (boojum tree), dry-growing bromeliads and several Agave species. The garden was designed by Eric Nagelmann and opened in 2004. A recent addition in 2014 completed Nagelmann's design.

Cacti and euphorbias gardens
A collection of cacti and euphorbias, including a mass of golden barrel cacti (Echinocactus grusonii) and large, weeping Euphorbia ingens.

The Cycad Garden
Lotusland has over 900 specimens of cycads, with nine of the eleven living genera and more than half of the known species represented. The collection includes three Encephalartos woodii, among the world’s rarest cycads and extinct in the wild.

Fern gardens
Featuring many types of ferns, such as Australian Tree Ferns (Sphaeropteris cooperi) and giant staghorn ferns (Platycerium). Other shade-loving plants such as angel trumpet tree (Brugmansia), calla lily (Zantedeschia), clivia hybrids and a collection of Hawaiian Pritchardia palms are present.

The Japanese Garden
A small Shinto shrine surrounded by Sugi (Cryptomeria japonica), Coast Redwood (Sequoia sempervirens cv. 'Santa Cruz'), a wisteria arbor, Japanese Maples (Acer palmatum), camellias, azaleas and several species of pine pruned in the Niwaki style.

Orchards collections
 Citrus orchard (oranges, lemons, limes, kumquat, grapefruit, and guava)
 Deciduous orchard, with 100 fruit trees (including peach, plum, apple, pear, persimmon and fig) and olive trees from the 1880s.

The Parterre Garden
Formal planting beds and brick walkways with two central water features. Plantings include hedges, floribunda roses, and day lilies.

Succulent gardens
A variety of succulents including Madagascar Palm (Pachypodium lamerei), Aeonium, Fouquieria, Kalanchoe, Echeveria, Haworthia, Yucca and Sansevieria.

The Topiary Garden
Featuring a horticultural clock 25 feet (8 m) in diameter, bordered by Senecio mandraliscae; a boxwood maze; and a "zoo" of 26 topiary animals, including a camel, gorilla, giraffe and seal. Other frames are shaped as chess pieces and geometric shapes. Lotusland received an anonymous $1 million gift to endow the topiary garden in 2014.

Tropical gardens
Featuring orchid cacti (Epiphyllum), gingers (both Alpinia and Hedychium) and bananas both ornamental (Ensete) and edible (Musa).

The Water Garden
Includes several species and cultivars of Indian lotus (Nelumbo nucifera) and water lily (Nymphaea, Euryale ferox, Nuphar, Victoria) and also bog gardens featuring taro (Colocasia esculenta), ornamental sugar cane (Saccharum cv.) and papyrus.

See also

 List of botanical gardens in the United States
 North American Plant Collections Consortium

References

Further reading

External links

 Official site

Botanical gardens in California
Gardens in California
History of Santa Barbara County, California
Landscape design history of the United States
Parks in Santa Barbara County, California
Open-air museums in California
Montecito, California
Mediterranean Revival architecture in California
Spanish Revival architecture in California
Japanese gardens in California
Cactus gardens